Acoustic Session is the first extended play by the Danish singer-songwriter Emmelie de Forest. The album was released on 1 September 2014 on Universal Music. It includes four tracks, including a cover of Nirvana's Smells Like Teen Spirit. The tracks were performed live at Millfactory Studios in Copenhagen, Denmark.

Track listing

2014 EPs
Emmelie de Forest albums